Nikolaus Gerhaert (c.1420 – 28 June 1473), also known as Nikolaus Gerhaert van Leyden, was a Dutch sculptor, although aside from his sculptures, few details are known of his life. He worked in both stone and wood.

Biography 
Gerhaert is considered to be the most influential northern European sculptor of the 15th century. He was born in Leiden, Holland (present day Netherlands) sometime around 1420. Based on the location of his work, he spent most his working life in the Germanic areas of Trier, Straßburg, Baden, Konstanz, and Vienna. Much of his documented work is lost to history, but what has survived is characterized by elaborate drapery and extreme physical realism, both extraordinarily vivid and unconventional. His specialties were tombs, altarpieces and other religious pieces. Sandstone and limestone are among his most frequent mediums.

One of his most well known works currently resides in the Musée de l’Œuvre Notre-Dame in Strasbourg (Alsace, present day France). Called the Buste d'homme accoudé (circa 1465), it is an undisputed masterpiece, and is believed to be a self-portrait. Gerhaert died on 28 June 1473 in Wiener Neustadt (present day Austria) while working on the tomb of emperor Frederick III. Nicolaus Gerhaert was summoned to the imperial court to create this tomb after the death of his wife empress Eleanor of Portugal. The tomb was completed in 1513.

Works 
Public works attributed to Nicolaus Gerhaert are the following:
 In Germany
 Baden-Baden, parish church: Crucifix of Baden-Baden, 1467
 Berlin, Bode museum: Madonna with child, circa 1460/1470
 Frankfurt, Liebieghaus: Two heads, a prophet and a sibylle, fragments from the portal of the Strasbourg chancellery
 Trier, Museum am Dom Trier: Tomb of archbishop Jakob von Sierck, 1462
 In Austria
 Vienna, Stephansdom: Tomb of emperor Frederick III
 In France
 Strasbourg, Cathedral of Strasbourg, chapel on the left side of the choir: Epitaph of canon Conrad de Bussnang, 1464
 Strasbourg, Musée de l'Œuvre Notre-Dame:
 Head of an ottoman in turban, circa 1464
 Meditating man, before 1467
 Head of a man with lopsided face, red sandstone
 In the United States
 New York, Metropolitan Museum of Art: Standing virgin with child, circa 1470
 Chicago, Art Institute of Chicago: Saint Margaret of Antioch (attributed), walnut with traces of polychromy, circa 1465

Gallery

See also
 Erasmus Grasser
 Veit Stoss
 Tilman Riemenschneider
 Michel Erhart
 Nikolaus Hagenauer

References

"Nikolaus Gerhaert von Leyden". In Encyclopædia Britannica Online.
Buste d'homme accoudé at the Musée de l'Oeuvre de Notre Dame in Strasbourg, picture and commentary from the Web Gallery of Art

External links 

1420s births
1473 deaths
Artists from Leiden
Early Netherlandish sculptors
Dutch sculptors
Dutch male sculptors
German male sculptors
Austrian male sculptors